The Waterloo Manufacturing Company, Ltd. was a Canadian farm engine builder based in Waterloo, Ontario, which built engines in sizes ranging from sixteen to thirty horsepower between 1880 and 1925.

Waterloo Manufacturing of Ontario is occasionally confused with the Waterloo Gasoline Engine Company, of Waterloo, Iowa, U.S., which was purchased by John Deere for its popular Waterloo Boy Tractor. No relationship between the companies exists.

History 
In the 1920s and 30's Waterloo Mfg served as Canadian distributors for many U.S.-built brands including  Hart Parr, Rock Island Heider, Rock Island, Belle City, Twin Cities, Minneapolis-Moline.

Waterloo Manufacturing continues to sell and service industrial boilers.

References

External links
 http://steamtraction.farmcollector.com/Farm-Life/WATERLOO-Manufacturing-Company-Limited.aspx#ixzz1Oor2lm9c
 http://www.waterloomanufacturing.ca/
 http://rockislandplowco.com/index_files/Waterloo.htm

Engine manufacturers of Canada
Companies based in Waterloo, Ontario
History of Waterloo, Ontario
Manufacturing companies based in Ontario
Defunct companies of Ontario
History of agriculture in Ontario
History of manufacturing in Ontario
Industrial history of the Regional Municipality of Waterloo